Nino Marcelli (about 1890 – August 4, 1967) was an Italian composer and conductor who revived the San Diego Symphony orchestra. Marcelli wrote compositions for musical theatre and oratorio including one for the Bohemian Club.

Biography
Marcelli was born in Rome, Italy, about 1890. When he was a small child, his family moved to Santiago, Chile, and he attended the National Music Conservatory. He became bandmaster to a U.S. Army band during World War I, and toured France. Marcelli became a United States citizen in 1917. After the war, Marcelli settled in San Francisco with a position as cellist in the San Francisco Symphony. In November 1920, Marcelli accepted a position to lead the high school orchestra in San Diego, there being but one high school at the time: San Diego High School. Under his leadership, the youth orchestra gained a national reputation in the 1920s, playing radio broadcasts and concerts in Los Angeles.

In 1922, Marcelli wrote the music for a Grove Play entitled The Rout of the Philistines, a libretto written by Charles Gilman Norris. He reported later that he had been inspired by the operas of Pietro Mascagni. Marcelli used four main themes for Philistine: the theme of Dagon, the God of the Philistines; the theme of Saph, the nobility of the race; the theme of Saph's love for humanity and his belief in brotherhood; and the theme of the forest.

Frustrated with the lack of future professional-level musician work for his graduating high school pupils, Marcelli revived an idea that had for years lain dormant in San Diego: a civic symphony orchestra. He obtained funding from Appleton S. Bridges and reformed the Civic Symphony Orchestra; the first concert was held at Spreckels Theater on April 11, 1927. The 80-strong ensemble, including vocalist Dusolina Giannini from Philadelphia, flawlessly played the prelude from Richard Wagner's Die Meistersinger von Nürnberg, Pyotr Ilyich Tchaikovsky's Symphony No. 6 in B minor, Pathétique and Marche Slave, and Anatoly Lyadov's Enchanted Lake. In following years, the organization played summer concerts at the Spreckels Organ Pavilion and the Starlight Bowl. Marcelli served as musical director from 1927 to 1938. The organization soon became known as the "San Diego Symphony," and was backed by the San Diego Symphony Orchestra Association.

In 1937, Marcelli published two instructional books, one for cellists and the other for bass players, and in 1939 he published an instructional book for orchestra and band.

Marcelli spoke as a guest lecturer at University of Southern California, University of Idaho, Western State College of Colorado and the California Music Colony. He served as guest conductor for the Hollywood Bowl, Los Angeles Philharmonic and the San Francisco Symphony. Marcelli conducted the Ford Symphony at the California Pacific International Exposition in 1935 and 1936.

In 1940, Marcelli served as the Master of San Diego's Grand Lodge. In 1950, he joined with George A. Finder to create a multi-colored plastic ukulele that would aid instruction.

At Marcelli's death, aged 77, in August 1967, the San Diego Tribune memorialized him, saying:

Works
1922 – The Rout of the Philistines, A Forest Play, a Grove Play
Song of Thanks, choral work
Holy, Holy, Holy, a capella choral arrangement with chimes, with Angela C. Marcelli
March Processional, heraldic trumpets
Suite Auracana, orchestral work
Ode to a Hero
Music Box Minuet
Two Christmas Processionals
Solitude, song
Deep in the Forest, song
Harp of Sunset, song
Song of the Andes, song
1939 – Carmelita, light opera

References

External links
 

1890 births
1967 deaths
Italian male composers
Italian male conductors (music)
Italian emigrants to the United States
20th-century Italian conductors (music)
20th-century Italian composers
20th-century Italian male musicians
San Diego High School alumni